Ŭnsan County is a kun (county) in South P'yŏngan province, North Korea.

Administrative divisions
Ŭnsan county is divided into 1 ŭp (town), 5 rodongjagu (workers' districts) and 16 ri (villages):

Transportation
Ŭnsan County is served by the P'yŏngra and Ŭnsan lines of the Korean State Railway.

References

Counties of South Pyongan